Vaine Makiroa Mokoroa (born 28 December 1966) is a Cook Islands politician and Cabinet Minister. He is a member of the Cook Islands Party.

Career
Mokoroa was born in 1966 in Atiu. He has previously worked as a police officer, chief of staff in the office of the Prime Minister, and as acting secretary of the Ministry of Infrastructure and Planning. He entered parliament in the 2018 elections, winning the seat of Nikao–Panama from Ngamau Munokoa. In September 2018 he was appointed to Cabinet as Minister of Police and Internal Affairs, following the sacking of Albert Nicholas. In June 2020 he surrendered his police portfolio and was appointed Education Minister in a Cabinet reshuffle.

In the Cabinet reshuffle following the appointment of Mark Brown as Prime Minister his position as Education Minister was confirmed, and he retained all his other Cabinet portfolios. A further reshuffle in June 2021 saw him swap his Internal Affairs portfolio for Justice.

He was re-elected at the 2022 Cook Islands general election.

References

1966 births
Living people
People from Atiu
University of the South Pacific alumni
Members of the Parliament of the Cook Islands
Cook Islands Party politicians
Government ministers of the Cook Islands